Gyantse, officially Gyangzê Town (also spelled Gyangtse;), is a town located in Gyantse County, Shigatse Prefecture, Tibet Autonomous Region, China. It was historically considered the third largest and most prominent town in the Tibet region (after Lhasa, and Shigatse), but there are now at least ten larger Tibetan cities.

Location
The town is strategically located in the Nyang Chu valley on the ancient trade routes from the Chumbi Valley, Yatung and Sikkim, which met here. From Gyantse, routes led to Shigatse downstream and also over the Kora La (Pass) to Central Tibet. The fortress (constructed in 1390) guarded the southern approaches to the Yarlung Tsangpo Valley and Lhasa. The town was surrounded by a wall 3 km long.

Demographics
In 1952, Gyantse had a population of perhaps 8,000 people, about the same as in 2008. It is 3,977 meters (13,050 ft) above sea level, and is located 254 km southwest of Lhasa in the fertile plain of the Nyang river valley and on a side branch of the Friendship Highway, which connects Kathmandu, Nepal to Lhasa. Gyantse was the third largest city in Tibet before being overtaken by Qamdo.

British military garrison

A British military garrison, consisting mainly of Indian soldiers, was stationed at Gyantse in the first half of the 20th century. It was referred to as a "small" outfit by Sir Walter Buchanan in 1919. Under the reign of the 13th Dalai Lama, it served as a military school to help train Tibetan officers. One Hank Baker, a radio operator posted in Tibet in World War II , is reported to have inspected "the Indian army garrison" "at Gyantse fort" in 1938. In 1940 the town was still garrisoned by British military.

Landmarks

Gyantse is notable for its restored Gyantse Dzong or fort, and its magnificent tiered Kumbum (literally: '100,000 images') of the Palcho Monastery, the largest chörten in Tibet. The Kumbum was commissioned by a Gyantse prince in 1427 and was an important centre of the Sakya school of Tibetan Buddhism. This religious structure contains 77 chapels in its six floors, and is illustrated with over 10,000 murals, many showing a strong Nepali influence, which have survived almost entirely intact. They are the last of its kind to be found in Tibet. Many of the restored clay statues are of less artistry than the destroyed originals - but they are still spectacular.

The town was nearly destroyed by flooding in 1954. After rioting in 1959, local industries were dismantled and artisans fled while others were placed in workcamps. Some 400 monks and laypeople were imprisoned in the monastery. During the Cultural Revolution, the fort, the monastery and Kumbum were ransacked. Precious objects were destroyed or sent out of Tibet. The chorten was spared.

The main building of the Pelkor Chode or Palcho Monastery and the Kumbum have been largely restored but the dzong or fort is still largely in ruins. There is an "Anti-British Imperialism Museum" there which gives the PRC version of the 1904 British invasion. The sculpture that forms the centerpiece of the museum are two "Tibetan" warriors, but they were based on photos taken by Lt. G. J. Davys in Chumbi Valley of non-Tibetans doing fake battles, and the armor were worn backwards.

Climate
Gyantse has an elevation-influenced humid continental climate (Köppen climate classification: Dwb).

Footnotes

References
 Allen, Charles. (2004). Duel in the Snows: The True Story of the Younghusband Mission to Lhasa. John Murray (publishers), London. .
 Buckley, Michael and Strauss, Robert. 1986. Tibet: a travel survival kit. Lonely Planet Publications, South Yarra, Australia. .
 Das, Sarat Chandra. 1902. Lhasa and Central Tibet. Reprint: Mehra Offset Press, Delhi. 1988. 
 Dorje, Gyurme. 1999. Footprint Tibet Handbook. 2nd Edition. Bath, England. . Also published in Chicago, U.S.A. .
 Dowman, Keith. 1988. The Power-places of Central Tibet: The Pilgrim's Guide. Routledge & Kegan Paul, London and New York. 
 Harris, Clare. 2012. The Museum on the Roof of the World: Art, Politics, and the Representation of Tibet. University of Chicago Press. 
 Mayhew, Bradley and Kohn, Michael. (2005). Tibet. Lonely Planet Publications. .
 Richardson, Hugh E (1984). Tibet and its History. Second Edition, Revised and Updated. Shambhala Publications, Boston. .
 Vitali, Roberto. Early Temples of Central Tibet. (1990). Serindia Publications. London. .
 von Schroeder, Ulrich. (1981). Indo-Tibetan Bronzes. (608 pages, 1244 illustrations). Hong Kong: Visual Dharma Publications Ltd. 
 von Schroeder, Ulrich. (2001). Buddhist Sculptures in Tibet. Vol. One: India & Nepal; Vol. Two: Tibet & China. (Volume One: 655 pages with 766 illustrations; Volume Two: 675 pages with 987 illustrations). Hong Kong: Visual Dharma Publications, Ltd.). 
 von Schroeder, Ulrich. 2008. 108 Buddhist Statues in Tibet. (212 p., 112 colour illustrations) (DVD with 527 digital photographs). Chicago: Serindia Publications. 
 Palin,Michael (2004). Himalaya with Michael Palin. (DVD Volume 4)

Gallery

External links

Populated places in Shigatse
Gyantse County
Township-level divisions of Tibet